Jackson Park may refer to:

Jackson Park (Chicago), Illinois, United States
Jackson Park (Negaunee, Michigan), United States
Jackson Park (Milwaukee), United States
Jackson Park (Seattle), Washington, United States
Jackson Park (Windsor, Ontario), Canada
Jackson Park, Kilternan, Republic of Ireland